Ozara, Oru West is a town in Oru West Local Government Area of Imo State, Nigeria. 
It comprises eight villages, namely: Umuogu, Umuokporoma, Umuezike, Umuobioma, Etitilabu, Ubahalanawam, Umukwa and Aboh. Umuogu is the eldest village in Ozara and the youngest is Aboh Ozara. It has three government-approved elementary schools, which are Town School, Central School, and Aboh Primary School. 
Ozara has many Christian churches, prominent among which is St Patrick Catholic Parish. The population is estimated at 3000 people. Towns neighbouring Ozara are Ohakpu, Amorka, Egbuoma, Obilikpa, and Mgbidi. It is located northeast of Imo State at the boundary with Anambra State.

Ozara has a local market called Orie Ozara which takes place every four days in a week. The major occupations of Ozara people are farming and trading.
The late Nze Kevin Chukwudire Umenyido-Ebochukwu of Umuobioma was the first educated teacher from Ozara, after graduating from the famous Government College Umuahia. Ozara people through self effort built three primary schools namely Ozara Central Primary School, Ozara Town School and Aboh Primary School, one secondary school Namely, Comprehensive Secondary School located in Ubahalanawam, a health center, electricity project and a plan for a road project before the unfortunate contest for tra aditional ruler that has lasted for years set them back.
Ozara has a tatablelandith so many tall palm trees.

Ozara has produced educated youths prominent among them is Bar. Eze Daniel Okafor.

References

Towns in Imo State